Larry, Laurence or Lawrence Miller may refer to:

Arts and entertainment
Larry Miller (accordionist) (born 1936), American Cajun accordion builder
Lawrence Miller (1944–2009), American art director, Best Scenic Design nominee in 1982 at 36th Tony Awards 
Larry Miller (artist) (born 1944), American pioneer in Fluxus mixed media
Laurence Miller, American art collector, founder in 1984 of Laurence Miller Gallery
Larry Miller (comedian) (born 1953), American actor, podcaster and columnist
Larry Miller (guitarist), American rock and avant garde musician active since 1980s

Business
Larry H. Miller (1944–2009), American automotive retail businessman and sports team owner of Utah Jazz
Larry Miller (sports executive), American sports apparel and basketball team president, active since 1980s
Larry S. Miller (born 1957), American entrepreneur

Politics
Lawrence G. Miller (1936–2014), American politician and businessman in Connecticut
Larry Miller (Tennessee politician) (born 1954), American legislator in Tennessee House of Representatives
Larry Miller (Canadian politician) (born 1956), member of Canadian House of Commons

Sports

Larry Miller (baseball) (1937–2018), American pitcher
Larry Miller (basketball player) (born 1946), American shooting guard 
Larry Miller (American football) (born 1962), American quarterback
Larry Miller (athlete) (born 1963), Antiguan Olympic runner